Aníbal de Jesús de Castro Rodríguez (born 1949) is a Dominican diplomat and journalist, who is currently the Dominican Republic Ambassador to Belgium and to the European Union.

He was educated at the Universidad Autónoma de Santo Domingo and the University of East Anglia (Development Studies, 1979). In 2004 he was appointed Ambassador to the United Kingdom, representing the Dominican Republic as nonresident Ambassador to Australia (2007–11) and the Republic of Ireland (2009–11). He served as Dominican Republic Ambassador to the United States from 2011 to 2014.

A well known journalist, he was founding editor of the newspaper Diario Libre, and has written opinion columns for Listín Diario.

References

|-

|-

|-

|-

|-

1949 births
Living people
Universidad Autónoma de Santo Domingo alumni
Alumni of the University of East Anglia
Ambassadors of the Dominican Republic to the United States
Ambassadors of the Dominican Republic to Spain
Place of birth missing (living people)
Ambassadors of the Dominican Republic to the United Kingdom
Dominican Republic expatriates in England